Glyn Houston (23 October 1925 – 30 June 2019) was a Welsh actor best known for his television work. He was the younger brother of film actor Donald Houston.

Early life
Glyndwr Desmond Houston was born at 10 Thomas Street, Tonypandy, Glamorgan, Wales.  He served in the army during the Second World War, and was briefly a stand-up comedian performing for soldiers during the war. He made his first film appearance in The Blue Lamp in 1950.

Career
In the 1970s Houston played Lord Peter Wimsey's valet Bunter opposite Ian Carmichael in television adaptations of several of Dorothy Sayers tales. His performance was praised in The New York Times. Later, he had a role as a literary agent in the 1980s British sitcom Keep It in the Family. He appeared in a number of films including The Great Game.

Other credits included My Good Woman (1973–1974), A Horseman Riding By (1978), Inspector Morse, It Ain't Half Hot Mum, Minder and Doomwatch, as well as the recurring character "Det Supt Jones" in Softly, Softly. He also appeared twice as different characters in Doctor Who — as "Professor Owen Watson" in The Hand of Fear (1976) and as "Colonel Ben Wolsey" in The Awakening (1984). He also played Brother Cadfael in a 1979 BBC Radio 4 adaptation of One Corpse Too Many. Houston had over two hundred television and film credits, dating back as early as 1950. Houston won a BAFTA Cymru special award in April 2008.

A highlight of Houston's career was his appearance at the concert to celebrate the opening of the National Assembly for Wales in 1999 along with other actors such as Ioan Gruffudd and Harry Secombe.

Personal life
Houston was married to the actress and model Shirley Lawrence and had two children. In May 2000 he unveiled a Mining Memorial in his native Rhondda at the Rhondda Heritage Park. He led the tributes to the thousands of miners who died and suffered during 150 years of mining in the South Wales coalfield. He released an autobiography titled Glyn Houston, A Black and White Actor in December 2009. Houston died at the age of 93 on 30 June 2019.

Selected filmography

 The Blue Lamp (1950) - Barrow Boy (uncredited)
 Waterfront (1950) - Sailor (uncredited)
 Trio (1950) - Ted (segment "The Verger")
 The Clouded Yellow (1950) - Lancastrian Bus Conductor (uncredited)
 Home to Danger (1951) - Minor Role (uncredited)
 High Treason (1951) - Railway Shunter (uncredited)
 I Believe in You (1952) - Passerby (uncredited)
 Wide Boy (1952) - George
 The Gift Horse (1952) - Assistant Engineer (uncredited)
 Girdle of Gold (1952) - Dai Thomas
 The Great Game (1953) - Ned Rutter
 The Cruel Sea (1953) - Phillips
 Turn the Key Softly (1953) - Bob
 Stryker of the Yard (1953)
 Hell Below Zero (1954) - Borg
 River Beat (1954) - Charlie Williamson
 The Rainbow Jacket (1954) - (uncredited)
 The Sleeping Tiger (1954) - Bailey
 Betrayed (1954) - Paratrooper Corporal (uncredited)
 The Sea Shall Not Have Them (1954) - Knox
 The Happiness of Three Women (1954) - Morgan
 Passage Home (1955) - Charley Boy
 Lost (1956) - Bus Driver (uncredited)
 Private's Progress (1956) - Corporal on Sick Call (uncredited)
 Who Done It? (1956) - Arresting Policeman (uncredited)
 The Long Arm (1956) - Detective-Sergeant in 'Q' car
 High Flight (1957) - Controller Leuchars
 The Birthday Present (1957) - Police Officer in Court (uncredited)
 The One That Got Away (1957) - Harry 'Hurricane' (uncredited)
 A Night to Remember (1958) - Stoker (uncredited)
 A Cry from the Streets (1958) - Police Sergeant (uncredited)
 Nowhere to Go (1958) - Box Office Clerk (uncredited)
 Tiger Bay (1959) - Detective at Police Station (uncredited)
 Breakout (1959) - Man in pub (uncredited)
 Jet Storm (1959) - Michaels
 Four Desperate Men (1959) (aka Siege of Pinchgut) - Navy Rating (uncredited)
 Follow a Star (1959) - Fred (Steam Cleaner) (uncredited)
 Sink the Bismarck! (1960) - Seaman on 'Prince of Wales' (uncredited)
 The Battle of the Sexes (1960) - 2nd Porter
 Circus of Horrors (1960) - Carnival Barker (uncredited)
 There Was a Crooked Man (1960) - Smoking Machinist
 The Bulldog Breed (1960) - Gym Instructor (uncredited)
 How Green Was My Valley (1960, TV series) - Davy Morgan
 Deadline Midnight (1961, TV series) - Mike Grieves
 Payroll (1961) - Frank Moore
 The Wind of Change (1961) - Det. Sgt. Parker
 The Green Helmet (1961) - Pit Manager
 Flame in the Streets (1961) - Hugh Davies
 Emergency (1962) - Inspector Harris
 Mix Me a Person (1962) - Sam
 Solo for Sparrow (1962) - Inspector Sparrow
 A Stitch in Time (1963) - Cpl. Welsh, St. John's Ambulance Brigade
 Panic (1963) - Mike
 One Way Pendulum (1965) - Detective Inspector Barnes
 The Secret of Blood Island (1965) - Berry
 The Brigand of Kandahar (1965) - Marriott
 Invasion (1965) - Police Sergeant Draycott
 Gideon's Way Episode: 'Fall High, Fall Hard' (TV series 1965) - Det. Sgt. Carmichael (his actor brother Donald Houston also appeared in the episode)
 Headline Hunters (1968) - Gresham
 Are You Being Served? (1977) - Cesar Rodriguez
 A Horseman Riding By (1978, TV Series) - John Rudd
 The Sea Wolves (1980) - Peters
 If You Go Down in the Woods Today (1981) - Ticket Collector
 Conspiracy (1989) - William Brain
 Old Scores (1991) - Aneurin Morgan
 The Mystery of Edwin Drood (1993) - Grewgious

References

External links
 

1925 births
2019 deaths
British Army personnel of World War II
People from Clydach Vale
Welsh male film actors
Welsh male comedians
Welsh male television actors
Welsh people of Scottish descent